Under the Whyte notation for the classification of steam locomotives, a  locomotive has two leading wheels on one axle, usually in a Bissel truck, ten coupled driving wheels on five axles, and four trailing wheels on two axles, usually in a bogie. These were referred to as the Texas type in most of the United States, the Colorado type on the Burlington Route, and the Selkirk type in Canada.

Overview
The  Texas wheel arrangement originated and was principally used in the United States. The evolution of this locomotive type began as a  Santa Fe type with a larger four-wheeled trailing truck that would allow an enlarged firebox. A subsequent development was as an elongated  Berkshire type that required extra driving wheels to remain within axle load limits. Examples of both of these evolutionary progressions can be found.

Some  tank locomotives also existed in eastern Europe. One extraordinary experimental  tender locomotive, built in the Soviet Union, had an opposed-piston drive system.

Usage

Belgian Congo

The Texas type was rare in Africa. One locomotive, numbered 801, was built for the CF du Bas-Congo au Katanga by Société Anonyme John Cockerill in 1939. The locomotive is believed to have been built for the line between Bukama and Kamina and accumulated  during its service lifetime. Even with its large size, it was hand-fired and had two firebox doors, with two firemen being carried.

Brazil
In South America, the Central Railway of Brazil ordered 17   locomotives, 10 from Baldwin, which were delivered in 1940, and another seven from the American Locomotive Company, which were delivered in 1947.

Canada
The Canadian Pacific (CP) Selkirk locomotives were all built by Montreal Locomotive Works (MLW). The first 20 of these large engines were built in 1929, designated T1a class and allocated numbers 5900 to 5919. Their Canadian type name was after the Selkirk Mountains across which they were placed in service, the railway summit of which was located just inside the western portal of the Connaught Tunnel beneath Rogers Pass.

MLW built another 10 of these successful locomotives for CP during November and December 1938, designated T1b class and numbered from 5920 to 5929.

A further six Selkirks, classed T1c and numbered from 5930 to 5935, were delivered by MLW in 1949. They were the last standard gauge steam locomotives to be built in Canada for a Canadian railway. These were very similar to the T1b class, apart from a few refinements, which included two cross-compound air compressors to speed up recharging of the air brake system, while some small streamlining touches were not retained, such as the streamlined casing around the smokebox stack and the teardrop shape of the classification lights. In addition, the insides of the cabs were no longer insulated in the same manner as the previous versions, which had provided better cold-weather cab insulation and were better liked by crews. The last Selkirks were taken out of service in 1959. These were the most powerful steam locomotives in the British Empire.

Japan 
In 1948, the JGR built five Class E10 tank locomotives for the purpose of supplementing the aging Class 4110 (0-10-0) in Itaya Pass on the Ou Main Line for a short time until electrification. E10 2 is statically stored.

South Africa

In 1937, the South African Railways (SAR) placed one  Class 21 steam locomotive with a Texas wheel arrangement in service, designed as a mixed traffic locomotive suitable for light rail. It was designed by A.G. Watson, chief mechanical engineer of the SAR from 1929 to 1936, and built by the North British Locomotive Company in Glasgow. Only the one locomotive was built, at the time representing the maximum power obtainable on Cape gauge from a 10-coupled, nonarticulated locomotive that was limited to a  axle load on  rail. To enable it to negotiate tight curves, the third and fourth sets of coupled wheels were flangeless.

The locomotive's Type FT tender was an unusual experimental type using six pairs of wheels in a 2-8-2 wheel arrangement, with the leading and trailing wheels in bissel-type pony trucks and the rest of the axles mounted with a rigid wheelbase. A similar Type JV tender had been built in the Salt River shops in Cape Town in 1936 for test purposes and as a prototype to the Type FT. The tender's wheel arrangement did not prove to be very successful, however, and was not used again.

Soviet Union
 
Two Texas-type locomotives were built in the USSR. One, the class OR23, built in 1949 by the locomotive works in Ulan Ude, had cylinders that were placed above the center driving axle. Unlike nearly all steam locomotives, the pistons had rods on both ends, which transferred power to the wheels. The idea was to balance the driving forces on the wheels, allowing the counterweights on the wheels to be smaller and reducing hammer blow on the track. Test runs showed, however, that the OR23 design was unsuitable as a practical locomotive. The locomotive was never used for more than testing and was returned to its builder and scrapped.

United States

Atchison, Topeka and Santa Fe Railway
The Atchison, Topeka and Santa Fe Railway (ATSF) took delivery of locomotive No. 3829 from the Baldwin Locomotive Works in 1919. It was used by ATSF as an experimental locomotive and was rostered as a member of ATSF's 3800 class of 2-10-2s that was fitted with a four-wheel trailing truck. Nearly 100 more 3800 class locomotives were delivered after No. 3829, but all with the 2-10-2 wheel arrangement. Photographs exist that show No. 3829 fitted with at least two different designs of four-wheel trailing truck through the years. No other members of the 3800 class have been documented with four-wheel trailing trucks. No. 3829 was scrapped in 1955, still equipped with a four-wheel trailing truck.

Santa Fe, which had originated the  type, adopted it again in 1930 with No. 5000, named Madame Queen. This locomotive was similar to the C&O T-1, with the same  drivers, but with  boiler pressure and 60% limited cutoff. It proved the viability of the type on the ATSF, but the Great Depression shelved plans to acquire more.

In 1938, with the railroad's fortunes improving, ATSF acquired 10 more  locomotives. These came with  diameter drivers and  boiler pressure, making these ATSF s the fastest and most modern of all.

Of the original order of ten, five were oil-burning and five coal-burning, but when Santa Fe ordered 25 more for delivery in 1944, all were delivered equipped to burn oil. The first of the 1944 batch produced  on road test, the highest figure known for a two-cylinder steam locomotive.

Texas and Pacific
The  type was revived in 1925 by the Lima Locomotive Works. This time, it was an expansion of the  Berkshire type that Lima had pioneered. A version of the Berkshire with 10 driving wheels instead of eight was an obvious development and the first to be delivered were to the Texas and Pacific Railway, after which the type was subsequently named. The four-wheel trailing truck allowed a much larger firebox, thus a greater ability to generate heat, and thus steam. The Superpower design, as Lima's marketing department called it, resulted in a locomotive that could develop great power at speed while not running out of steam-generating ability.

Bessemer and Lake Erie
Baldwin built a fleet of 47 H-1 class 2-10-4s for the Bessemer and Lake Erie Railroad, an iron ore–hauling railroad, between 1929 and 1944, in eight subclasses numbered 601–647. Eighteen were sold in 1951 to the Duluth, Missabe and Iron Range Railway, another ore-hauling railroad, that renumbered them 700–717. By the beginning of the 1960s, all but one were sold for scrap. The exception was No. 643, which almost operated in excursion service in the late 1990s, but for its large size. It is now owned by the Age of Steam Roundhouse.

Chesapeake and Ohio
The early Lima-built Texas types were low-drivered,  in diameter, which did not leave enough space to fully counterweight the extremely heavy and sturdy side rods and main rods required for such a powerful locomotive's piston thrusts. All subsequent Texas types were of this higher-drivered sort.

Pennsylvania Railroad
The Pennsylvania Railroad (PRR) ordered few new locomotives after 1930, since electrification both consumed the railroad's resources and resulted in a supply of excess steam locomotives that eliminated any requirement for new power. Until the Second World War had begun, the PRR's locomotive fleet had not begun to appear inadequate. Although the PRR urgently needed new and modern freight power, the War Production Board prohibited working on a new design, and not enough time remained to trial a prototype in any event, the PRR cast around for other railroads' designs that it might modify for PRR use.

Some modifications were made to the design for these PRR "War Babies". These included PRR drop-couplers, sheet-steel pilots, PRR-style cabs, large PRR tenders, Keystone number plates up front, and other modifications. It still betrayed its foreign heritage by lacking the PRR trademark Belpaire firebox and by having a booster engine on the trailing truck. Altogether, 125 locomotives were built between 1942 and 1944 and became the largest fleet of Texas-type locomotives in existence. All were eventually sold as scrap when the Pennsylvania Railroad converted to diesel.

North American owners of Texas types

Preserved Texas types in North America

References